Nie Yuanzi (5 April 1921 – 28 August 2019) was a Chinese academic administrator at Peking University, known for writing a big-character poster criticising the university for being controlled by the bourgeoisie, which is considered to have been the opening shot of the Cultural Revolution. She became a top leader of the Red Guards in Beijing, and was sentenced to 17 years in prison after the end of the Cultural Revolution.

Early life 
Nie was born in 1921 into a wealthy family in Hua County, Henan, the youngest of four siblings. Her eldest brother, Nie Zhen, was a founder of the Communist Party cell in the county. He was married to Wang Qian, a senior Party member and the ex-wife of then President Liu Shaoqi.

When the Second Sino-Japanese War broke out in July 1937, Nie, then sixteen years old, joined the Communist resistance in Shanxi, which was supported by warlord Yan Xishan. She received military training at the National Teachers' College in Taiyuan and joined the Communist Party in 1938. In the 1940s, Nie moved to the Communist base in Yan'an, where she met Kang Sheng and his wife .

After the surrender of Japan, Nie was sent to the formerly Japanese-occupied Northeast China in 1946, where she worked in the government of Qiqihar. A year later, she was appointed Director of the Theory Section of the Propaganda Department of Harbin. In 1959, she divorced her first husband Wu Hongyi, with whom she had two children, after he was denounced as a "rightist" during the Anti-Rightist Campaign.

In 1963, Nie was transferred to Peking University, a turning point of her life. She served as Vice Chair of the Department of Economics and was appointed Party Secretary of the Department of Philosophy a year later. In early 1966, she married , an official in the powerful Central Commission for Discipline Inspection and a peer of the radical leader Kang Sheng. Many thought that she married him to further her own career.

Cultural Revolution 

On 25 May 1966, Nie put up a big-character poster on the campus of Peking University. The poster criticised Song Shuo, deputy director of the Beijing Municipal University Bureau, Lu Ping, the President of Peking University and head of its Party committee, and Peng Peiyun, an official in the Beijing Municipal University Bureau. Although Nie's main criticism was over the control of Peking University by the bourgeoisie, the aim of the campaign was to legitimise the purge of the Beijing municipal party chief Peng Zhen, by exposing his alleged crime of supporting a bourgeoise reactionary education line. This was pushed by members of the radical left-lean clique surrounding Mao Zedong, including Kang Sheng and his wife Cao Yi'ou.

A week later, Mao Zedong ordered the poster to be read on the Central People's Broadcasting Station and published in the People's Daily, accompanied by official commentaries. Two months later, Mao declared her poster as the "first Chinese Marxist-Leninist big-character poster". Mao's approval encouraged attacks on authorities and inspired students at other universities to write posters, most of which expressed support for the "revolutionary action" of Nie.

Nie initially supported the persecution of other academics, but later disagreed on the course the Cultural Revolution was taking and tried to quit her position in the Red Guards. She controlled revolutionary activities at Peking University, along with her colleagues, protected by her status as a celebrated rebel. She became widely known as one of the top five leaders of Red Guards in the capital.

Nie was made an alternate member of the 9th Central Committee of the Communist Party of China. In December 1969, she was sent to labour at Peking University's farm in Liyuzhou, Jiangxi. She returned to Beijing in 1970 to recuperate from an illness.

In 1971, Nie was subjected to examination and her movements were restricted. In 1973, she was sent to work in the Xinhua Printing House, where she lived, ate and slept in the factory. She moved to a factory that made apparatuses for Peking University in 1975.

Imprisonment and later life 
After the end of the Cultural Revolution, Nie was sent to Yanqing Prison on 19 April 1978. In 1983, she was convicted of multiple crimes including counterrevolutionary activities and defamation. She was sentenced to 17 years in prison, with apparently Deng Xiaoping insisting on a severe sentence.  Nie was paroled in October 1986.

In 1998, the renowned scholar Ji Xianlin published his memoir Cowshed: Memories of the Chinese Cultural Revolution, recounting his persecution during the period. In the book, Ji strongly condemned Nie Yuanzi for her capriciousness, cruelty and arrogance.

Nie was critical of the post-Mao Chinese government and expressed a desire for greater freedom of opinion. In 2005, her memoirs were published in Hong Kong.

Nie died on 28 August 2019, aged 98.

Bibliography

References

Notes

Works cited

Further reading 
 

1921 births
2019 deaths
Red Guards
Chinese autobiographers
20th-century Chinese writers
Maoist theorists
Chinese communists
Academic staff of Peking University
20th-century Chinese criminals
Alternate members of the 9th Central Committee of the Chinese Communist Party
People from Anyang
Chinese Maoists